Prefaces is a book by Søren Kierkegaard published under the pseudonym Nicolaus Notabene. The meaning of the pseudonym used for Prefaces, Nicholaus Notabene, was best summed up in his work Writing Sampler, where Kierkegaard said twice for emphasis, “Please read the following preface, because it contains things of the utmost importance.” He was trying to tell his critics to read the preface to his books because they have the key to understanding them. Nota bene is Latin for "note well".

Context
Prefaces was published June 17, 1844, the same date as The Concept of Anxiety (also by a pseudonym: Vigilius Haufniensis).  This was the second time Kierkegaard published his works on the same date, (the first being Oct 16, 1843, with the publication of Repetition alongside Three Upbuilding Discourses, 1843 and Fear and Trembling). Kierkegaard published 14 separate works between the publication of Either/Or on February 20, 1843 and Four Upbuilding Discourses which he published on August 31, 1844.

Kierkegaard contrasted one fictional author with another frequently. This book and its companion piece, The Concept of Anxiety, contrasts Notabene, who is mediated by his wife as well as his reviewer, with Haufniensis, who is against his knowledge of sin being mediated by Adam.

Nicolaus Notabene is a married man who wants to be a writer. His new wife becomes suspicious and forces him to vow to write only prefaces.   It is a series of prefaces for unwritten books, books unwritten because the fictitious Notabene's wife has sworn to divorce him if he ever becomes a writer. But for Notabene writing a preface is just a prelude to an act, it’s “like sharpening a scythe or like tuning a guitar”. He tried flattering his wife by telling her she is the “muse who inspires him,” but she says, “Either a properly married man or …” He “promises not to insist on being an author.” Since he wants to live in the “literary world” he makes sure he lives up to the “custom” of the “sacred vow”. 

He writes prefaces about “the reading public's” relationship to an author. The author has to “live in public view” once she publishes a book.  Notabene then attacks reviewers of books in general, calling them “the highly trusted minions of the most esteemed public, its cupbearers and privy counselors" and the reviewers of his books, Either/Or and Repetition, Johan Ludvig Heiberg and Hans Lassen Martensen in particular. Kierkegaard was complaining because his books weren't being read, they were being mediated. He says, “a rumor carries away the reading public as the muse’s impulse the poet, since like always effects like.” And the rumor was that all theologians should be philosophers. Kierkegaard put it this way. 

Notabene makes fun of Hieberg because Hieberg seems to want to explain everything, just like Hegel. Both want to be mediators of understanding. But Notabene says,My frame, my health, my entire constitution do not lend themselves to mediation. It may well be that this is a flaw, but when I myself confess it, surely one might humor me. When the word “mediation” is merely mentioned everything becomes so magnificent and grandiose that I do not feel well but am oppressed and chafed. Have compassion on me in only this one respect; exempt me from mediation and, what is a necessary consequence, from becoming the innocent occasion that would cause one or another philosophical prattler to repeat, like a child at the chancel step, something I indeed know well enough: the history of modern philosophy’s beginning with Descartes, and the philosophical fairy tale about how being and nothing combine their deficiencies so that becoming emerges from it, along with whatever other amazing things happened later in the continuation of the tale, which is very animated and moving although it is not a tale but a purely logical movement. Prefaces p. 45

Vigilius Haufniensis says the same thing in The Concept of Anxiety,

Criticism
Georg Brandes discussed both Heiberg and Kierkegaard in his 1886 book, Eminent Authors of the Nineteenth Century. Literary Portraits Though he started in his general aesthetic views on the career pointed out by Heiberg, he nevertheless struck ere long into his own independent course. Heiberg was only a moralist in the name of true culture and of good taste; Paludan-Muller became one in the name of stern religious discipline. In religious questions, Heiberg had espoused the cause of Hegelian speculative Christianity; Paludan-Muller became an orthodox theologian. Thus his path for not an inconsiderable distance ran parallel with that of Søren Kierkegaard. Not that he was in any way influenced by this solitary thinker. He cherished but little sympathy for him, and was repelled by his broad, unclassical form, for whose merits he had no comprehension, and whose inner harmony with the mind of the author he did not perceive. It was the general spirit of the times which produced the intellectual harmony of these two solitary chastisers of their contemporaries. p. 321 Kierkegaard speaks of the "cultured" in this way, "For the cultured it is truly too little to have to deal with an individual human being, even though that human being is himself. He does not want to be disturbed when he is to be built up, does not want to be reminded of all the trifles, of individuals, of himself, because to forget all this is precisely the upbuilding."

Notes

References

Sources

Primary sources
 Prefaces/Writing Sampler, Light Reading For People in Various Estates According to Time and Opportunity, by Nicolaus Notabene, Edited and Translated by Todd W. Nichol, 1997, Princeton University Press

Secondary sources
 Eminent authors of the nineteenth century. Literary portraits (1886) by Georg Brandes Brandes references Kierkegaard quite often in this book.
 Anthony D Storm's Commentary on Soren Kierkegaard, Prefaces

External links
 

1844 non-fiction books
Books by Søren Kierkegaard
Works published under a pseudonym